Krugloye is a rural locality (a selo) and the administrative center of Kruglyansky Selsoviet, Uglovsky District, Altai Krai, Russia. The population was 731 as of 2013. There are 6 streets. It was founded in 1877.

Geography 
Krugloye is located 28 km east of Uglovskoye (the district's administrative centre) by road. Kuybyshevo is the nearest rural locality.

References 

Rural localities in Uglovsky District, Altai Krai